As Far as Siam is the second studio album by the Canadian rock band Red Rider. The majority of the album was recorded at Sunset Sound in Los Angeles and produced by Richard Landis; two tracks were produced in Toronto by Michael James Jackson. The album was released by Capitol Records on June 30, 1981.

The album reached #65 on Billboard's Pop Albums chart in 1981. The single "What Have You Got to do (To Get Off Tonight)" peaked at #16 on the Canadian charts.

Background and writing 
"Lunatic Fringe", the band's most famous song, is about what composer Tom Cochrane saw as an alarming rise of anti-Semitism in the 1970s, and was inspired by a book he read about Raoul Wallenberg. The song is featured in the 1985 high-school wrestling movie Vision Quest, the Miami Vice episode Smuggler's Blues, the My Name Is Earl episode "The Bounty Hunter" and on an episode of Eastbound & Down. The beginning of the song is used as a part of a bump for the Cincinnati radio station, WEBN. It is also the inspiration for Kurt Angle's entrance theme in Total Nonstop Action Wrestling. It is also used as American Mixed Martial Artist Dan Henderson's and Randy Couture's entrance theme as of late. American guitarist Gary Hoey covered "Lunatic Fringe" on his 2006 album American Made.

The distinctive guitar solo in "Lunatic Fringe" was performed by Kenny Greer on a lap steel, also seen in the song's music video.

Track listing

Personnel 
 Tom Cochrane - lead vocals, rhythm guitar
 Ken Greer - lead electric, steel and six string guitars, piano, organ
 Jeff Jones - bass guitar, background vocals
 Peter Boynton - piano, synthesizers, organ, vocals
 Rob Baker - drums, percussion, harmonica

Additional personnel
 Peter Wolf - synthesizers
 Jai Winding - keyboards
 Tom Sowell - theremin
 George Doering - acoustic guitar
 Charlie Calello - string arrangements on "Ships"

References

External links 
 Lyrics

Red Rider albums
1981 albums
Capitol Records albums
Albums produced by Richard Landis